Yekaterina Saltykov (1791-1863), was a Russian courtier. The daughter of Ekaterina Feodorovna Baryatinskaya-Dolgorukova, she served as lady in waiting to empress Elizabeth Alexeievna (Louise of Baden). She was married to Sergei Nikolayevich Saltykov. She was served as chief lady in waiting of the court of the crown prince in 1840-55 and the emperor 1855-63, during which she exerted a considerable influence at the court.

References 
 Русские портреты XVIII—XIX столетий. Изд. Вел. Кн. Николая Михайловича. — СПб., 1906. — Т. II. — Вып III. — № 111.

1791 births
1863 deaths
Ladies-in-waiting from the Russian Empire